Amihai Ben-Eliyahu (born 24 April 1979), commonly known as Amihai Eliyahu, is an Israeli politician and activist who serves as Minister of Heritage since 2022. Eliyahu also briefly served as a member of Knesset for Otzma Yehudit following the 2022 Israeli legislative election.

Biography
Eliyahu is the son of Shmuel Eliyahu and the grandson of Mordechai Eliyahu, the former Sephardi Chief Rabbi of Israel.

Political career
Eliyahu was placed fourth on the Otzma Yehudit list in the 2022 Israeli legislative election, and became an MK. He became Minister for Jerusalem Affairs and Heritage on 29 December 2022 and resigned from the Knesset on 1 January 2023 as part of the Norwegian Law.

References

1979 births
Living people
Members of the 25th Knesset (2022–)
Otzma Yehudit politicians
Government ministers of Israel